Soldier Like Ma Papa is the debut studio album by Cameroonian rapper Stanley Enow. It was released in Cameroon on  July 25, 2015 and worldwide on September 11, 2015.  The album was distributed by Sony Music Entertainment via Rockstar4000. The album's title pays tribute to Enow's father, who is a veteran of the Cameroon Army. Soldier Like Ma Papa is predominantly hip-hop, but contains elements of ragga, reggae, R&B. It features guest appearances from Bill Muicha, Claude Ndam, Locko, 2Baba, Ice Prince, DJ Neptune, Biz Ice, Sarkodie and F.A.B.

Track listing

References

2015 albums
Stanley Enow albums
Albums produced by Jay Sleek
Albums produced by Sammy Gyang